Hansüli Kreuzer (born 20 April 1950) is a Swiss cross-country skier. He competed at the 1972,  1976 and 1980 Winter Olympics.

References

External links
 

1950 births
Living people
Swiss male cross-country skiers
Olympic cross-country skiers of Switzerland
Cross-country skiers at the 1972 Winter Olympics
Cross-country skiers at the 1976 Winter Olympics
Cross-country skiers at the 1980 Winter Olympics
Place of birth missing (living people)